Albert Weston Grant (April 14, 1856 – September 30, 1930) was an admiral of the United States Navy. He served during the Spanish–American War and was commander of Battleship Force 1, Atlantic Fleet, in World War I.

Biography
Grant was born on April 14, 1856, at East Benton, Maine. He grew up at Stevens Point, Wisconsin, with his pioneer family and won a competitive appointment to the United States Naval Academy, from which he graduated on June 20, 1877.

On May 9, 1893, his commission as a lieutenant reached him while he was serving in that gunboat. A tour in cruiser  ended in the summer of 1894 when Grant was ordered back to the Naval Academy for duty as an instructor.

During this assignment, he prepared a study of naval tactics, The School of the Ship, which became a standard textbook.

Grant took the Arethusa  around Cape Horn to the Pacific. During that tour of duty, he was promoted to captain on July 1, 1909. He relinquished his post as chief of staff on October 26, 1909, but remained in Connecticut as her commanding officer.

Grant became commandant of the Philadelphia Navy Yard on March 21, 1910, and simultaneously took command of the 4th Naval District. Two years later, he became head of the Atlantic Reserve Fleet. Command of the new battleship  came in 1913 and command of Submarine Flotilla, Atlantic Fleet, followed two years later.

In the summer of 1917 — some three months after the United States entered World War I — Grant took over Battleship Force 1, Atlantic Fleet, with additional duty in command of Squadron 2 and Division 4. This position gave him the rank of vice admiral. During the last four months of 1918, Grant served as acting commander of the entire western portion of the U.S. Atlantic Fleet during the absence of Admiral Henry T. Mayo. He was awarded the Distinguished Service Medal for his World War I service. In 1919, he became commandant of the Washington Navy Yard and superintendent of the Naval Gun Factory.

Retired on April 6, 1920, Grant died in Philadelphia on September 30, 1930. Grant and his wife Florence Southall (Sharp) Grant (1857–1947) are buried at Elmwood Cemetery in Norfolk, Virginia. His great-great-grandson, Richard Weston Grant III, is a graduate of the class of 2009 from the United States Naval Academy.

Namesake
In 1943, the destroyer  was named in honor of Grant, sponsored by his granddaughter, Miss Nell Preston Grant.

References

 

1856 births
1930 deaths
People from Benton, Maine
People from Stevens Point, Wisconsin
United States Naval Academy alumni
Military personnel from Wisconsin
United States Navy personnel of the Spanish–American War
United States Navy personnel of World War I
United States Navy vice admirals
Admirals of World War I
Recipients of the Navy Distinguished Service Medal